The Waiters' Picnic is a 1913 American short comedy film featuring Fatty Arbuckle, Mabel Normand, and Al St. John.

Cast
 Roscoe 'Fatty' Arbuckle
 Mabel Normand
 Al St. John
 Hank Mann
 Ford Sterling

See also
 List of American films of 1913
 Fatty Arbuckle filmography

External links

1913 films
American silent short films
1913 comedy films
1913 short films
American black-and-white films
Silent American comedy films
American comedy short films
Films directed by Mack Sennett
1910s American films